Miguel Ángel Marriaga Herrera (born June 6, 1984) is a Venezuelan professional basketball player.

Professional career
In his pro career, Marriaga has played in the 2nd-tier South American League.

National team career
Marriaga has represented the senior men's team of Venezuela at various tournaments. He won a gold medal at the 2014 South American Championship, and a gold medal at the 2015 FIBA Americas Championship. He also played at the men's basketball competition at the 2016 Summer Olympics.

References

External links
FIBA Profile
FIBA Game Center Profile
Latinbasket.com Profile

1984 births
Living people
Basketball players at the 2016 Summer Olympics
Centers (basketball)
Ciclista Olímpico players
Estudiantes Concordia basketball players
Gaiteros del Zulia players
Guaros de Lara (basketball) players
Olympic basketball players of Venezuela
Soles de Mexicali players
Sportspeople from Maracaibo
Trotamundos B.B.C. players
Venezuelan men's basketball players
Venezuelan expatriate basketball people in Argentina
Venezuelan expatriate basketball people in Colombia
Venezuelan expatriate basketball people in Mexico
2006 FIBA World Championship players
Basketball players at the 2015 Pan American Games